Seenugadu Chiranjeevi Fan is a 2005 Indian Telugu romantic drama film directed by Poosala Radha Krishna and starring Akula Vijay and Adin Khan.

Synopsis
Seenu (Akula Vijay Vardhan) is a responsible youngster and an ardent fan of Chiranjeevi. When a car drives fast ahead of his cousin Swati (Maansi), seenu tracks the car driver Anjali (Adin Khan) and makes her apologize. Due to this delay, Anjali misses writing the finals of civil services exams. She forcibly starts saying in the family of seenu as he ruined her education. Anjali falls in love with seenu and she loses her eyesight due to the colors he threw on her eyes during holi festival. Seenu consults Chiranjeevi Charitable Trust and gets a personal assurance letter from Chiranjeevi. When seenu wants to tell this good news, Anjali is found practicing shooting in a local mela. When Seenu confronts Anjali why she lied to him, she tells him that she wants to take revenge on him for being the cause of the death of her guardian and her fiancée Kumar (Ravi Prakash). Later on Kumar returns to Anjali saying that he is still alive. Seenu also realizes that Kumar is a cheater and he is marrying Anjali just for the sake of money. The rest of the story is all about how Seenu exposes Kumar.

Cast
Akula Vijay Vardhan as Seenu 
Adin Khan as Anjali
Mansi Pritam as Swati 
Kota Srinivasa Rao as Seenu's grandfather
Sivaji Raja as Seenu's brother
Surekha Vani as Seenu's sister-in-law
Ravi Prakash as Kumar
Venu Madhav
Nagendra Babu as himself in climax

Soundtrack

References

External links
Sulekha.com Review

2000s Telugu-language films
2005 films